Cha Jun-hwan (Hangul: 차준환; born October 21, 2001) is a South Korean figure skater who competes in the men's singles discipline. He is the 2022 Four Continents champion, the 2018–2019 Grand Prix Final bronze medalist, the 2016–17 Junior Grand Prix Final bronze medalist, and a seven-time consecutive South Korean national champion (2017–2023). He has won five bronze medals on the ISU Grand Prix series and four medals on the ISU Challenger Series (including gold at the 2022 CS Finlandia Trophy). He represented South Korea at the 2018 Winter Olympics and the 2022 Winter Olympics.

Personal life
Cha was born on October 21, 2001, in Seoul. He has worked as a child actor, model, and ballet dancer. He has a brother who is four years older than him. Cha appeared on music variety television show King of Mask Singer in June 2020.

He speaks English fluently.

Career
Cha began skating at the age of seven, during a school excursion. His first coach was Shin Hea-sook. His skating idols were Evgeni Plushenko and Daisuke Takahashi.

Early career
Cha placed fourth as a junior skater at the 2011 South Korean Championships. In 2012, he won the junior level at the South Korean Championships. In the 2012–13 season, he took the novice gold medal at the Asian Trophy and repeated as the junior champion at the South Korean Championships. He placed fifth at the senior level at the 2014 Korean Championships. This was his first senior experience at national championships.

During the 2014–15 season, Cha won the novice gold medal at the Merano Cup and the senior bronze medal at the South Korean Championships. In March 2015, he began training in Toronto under Brian Orser to improve his jumps, including the triple Axel and quads.

2015–16 season: Junior international debut 

Making his junior international debut, Cha won gold at the 2015 Skate Canada Autumn Classic by over 30 points. Competing with an ear infection at the 2016 South Korean Championships, he repeated as the senior national bronze medalist. In February, he represented South Korea at the 2016 Winter Youth Olympics in Lillehammer, Norway, placing fourth in the short program, fifth in the free skating, and fifth overall. In March, Cha competed in Debrecen, Hungary, at the 2016 World Junior Championships, placing seventh in the short program, sixth in the free skating, and seventh overall.

2016–17 season: Junior Grand Prix Final bronze

In the 2016–17 season, Cha made his Junior Grand Prix debut at the JGP Japan. He performed a clean short program except for his flying camel spin, which got a level 2. He received 79.34 points, which put him in second place. In the free program, he skated cleanly except for an under-rotation on his triple Salchow. He was the last skater in the free skate, placing first by scoring another personal best of 160.13 points, and set a new world record of 239.47 points for junior men's combined total score.  He won a second gold medal at the 2016 JGP Germany, which qualified him for the 2016–17 Junior Grand Prix Final, where he won the bronze medal.

Cha won his first national title in January 2017 at the South Korean Championships.  He finished fifth at the 2017 World Junior Championships.

2017–18 season: Pyeongchang Olympics

Cha had to overcome injuries and boot problems to win his second national title in January 2018 at the South Korean Championships.  Having accumulated the highest point total across the three qualifying events, Cha was selected to represent South Korea at the 2018 Winter Olympic Games in Pyeongchang, South Korea, where he placed fifteenth as the youngest competitor in the men's event.

2018–19 season: Grand Prix Final bronze
Cha began his season by winning the silver medal at the 2018 Autumn Classic, after placing second in the short program with 90.56 points and first in the free skate with 169.22, ahead of training mate Yuzuru Hanyu. He won the silver medal at the 2018 Finlandia Trophy with a total score of 239.19 points, behind Mikhail Kolyada.

At his first Grand Prix assignment, the 2018 Skate Canada, he placed third in the short program and third in the free skate to win the bronze medal overall, landing two clean quadruple salchows across both segments of the competition. With this finish, Cha became the second-ever South Korean figure skater to win a Grand Prix medal, after Yuna Kim, and the first-ever South Korean man to make the podium at a Grand Prix.  Cha then won a second bronze medal at 2018 Grand Prix of Helsinki with a total of 243.19 points, making him the first-ever South Korean man to win two medals on the Grand Prix series. These two bronze medals gave him 22 qualification points, enough for him to qualify for the 2018 Grand Prix Final, making him the first South Korean man to do so and the first from his country since Kim.

Cha concluded the Grand Prix series at the final, placing fourth in the short program and third in the free skate, with a season's best of 174.42 in the free skate and 263.49 for his total score. This put him on the podium in third place, earning him the bronze medal. He is the first South Korean man to win a Grand Prix Final medal and the second-ever South Korean skater to do so since Kim.

After winning this third consecutive South Korean national title, Cha competed at the 2019 Four Continents Championships.  He placed second in the short program, winning a small silver medal.  He struggled in the free skate, where six of his jumps were called underrotated. He placed eighth in the free skate and dropped to sixth place overall.

He concluded his season at the 2019 World Figure Skating Championships. He placed eighteenth in both the short program and free skate to finish nineteenth overall.

2019–20 season
Beginning the season at the 2019 CS Autumn Classic International, Cha attempted the quad flip in competition for the first time. Cha was fourth overall in the competition after several jumps were called underrotated.  At his first Grand Prix assignment, 2019 Skate America, Cha doubled his planned quad in the short program placing seventh.  Multiple falls in the free skate dropped him to eighth overall.  Cha was sixth at the 2019 Cup of China.

After winning another Korean national title, Cha competed at the 2020 Four Continents Championships, held in Seoul. He earned a season's best in the short program despite underrotating his triple Axel attempt. In the free skate, four of his jumps were called underrotated, which was sufficient to keep him off the podium at the event. Cha was assigned to represent South Korea at 2020 World Championships but the competition was cancelled due to coronavirus pandemic.

2020–21 season 
The pandemic prompted long-term changes to Cha's training situation, as he could no longer reside in Canada, where he had trained since 2015. Cha was assigned to compete at the 2020 Skate Canada International, but the event was also cancelled as a result of the pandemic.

Cha's first event of the season was the 2021 South Korean Championships, where he won his fifth consecutive title. He was assigned to Korea's lone men's berth at the 2021 World Championships in Stockholm. Cha placed eighth in the short program. Errors in the free skate had him place thirteenth in that segment, but he held tenth overall. Cha's result qualified one berth for Korea at the 2022 Winter Olympics, with the possibility of a second to be earned later.

2021–22 season: Four Continents champion and Beijing Olympics 
Cha's first competition of the season was the Olympic test event, the 2021 Asian Open in Beijing, where he placed sixth. His first Grand Prix assignment was initially the 2021 Cup of China, but following its cancellation he was reassigned to the 2021 Gran Premio d'Italia in Turin. Third in the short program, he dropped to fifth overall after a sixth-place free skate. At this second Grand Prix, 2021 NHK Trophy, he was third in the short program and fifth in the free skate. However, despite his fifth-place free, he remained in third overall, taking the bronze medal. Cha pronounced himself "happy but also disappointed because I had a lot of mistakes, I really fought through."

After winning his sixth South Korean national title, Cha was named to the South Korean Olympic team. First sent to compete at the 2022 Four Continents Championships in Tallinn, Cha placed first in both segments to take the gold medal, becoming the first South Korean man to win a medal at Four Continents. He said afterwards that "when coming here, I was not thinking about medals or winning this competition, just training and just doing what I trained before. It was pretty tough to solve all the elements during my practice sessions, but finally, I got the medal, and I'm very satisfied with this."

Competing at the 2022 Winter Olympics in the men's event, Cha skated a clean short program to place fourth in that segment with a new personal best of 99.51. He admitted to nervousness beforehand due to concerns about results but said that "despite my nervousness, I, trusting my own competence, managed to finish this program as I did in my training." Cha opened his free skate with a hard fall on the quad toe loop but recovered to execute the rest of the program, placing seventh in that segment and finishing fifth overall.

Cha concluded his season at the 2022 World Championships in a men's field considerably more open than usual due to the absences of Nathan Chen and Yuzuru Hanyu and the International Skating Union banning all Russian athletes due to their country's invasion of Ukraine. He placed seventeenth in the short program but subsequently withdrew before the free skate due to boot problems.

2022–23 season 
Following the end of the Beijing Olympic cycle, Cha said he wanted to break his habit of using "rather classical music" and instead ", I wanted to show a different side of my character and reinvent myself on the ice. I wanted something modern, with vocals." He and choreographer Shae-Lynn Bourne chose the music of Michael Jackson for the short program, while the free skate used the soundtrack of the James Bond film No Time to Die, which he cited as one of his favourites. Cha opted to begin the season with back-to-back events on the Challenger series, citing a desire for "motivation for myself to improve as quickly as possible." He won silver at the 2022 CS Nepela Memorial and then gold at the 2022 CS Finlandia Trophy on the following weekend.

Cha's first Grand Prix assignment of the year was the 2022 Skate America, where he won the bronze medal. He said the result was "not perfect, and it was not what I wanted, but I tried hard, and I'm quite satisfied." At this second event, the 2022 NHK Trophy, he finished sixth in the short program after two jumping errors. He rallied in the free skate, finishing second in that segment and rising to third overall for his second bronze medal of the series. He expressed pleasure at the result after disappointment on the previous day.

After winning a seventh consecutive national title, Cha competed at the 2023 Four Continents Championships, and finished fifth in the short program after falling on his jump combination and having his triple Axel called on the quarter. A strong free skate lifted him to fourth overall.

Records and achievements
 The first South Korean male skater to win and medal at an ISU Championship (4CC 2022)
 The first South Korean male skater to medal at the Grand Prix Final (2018–19 Grand Prix Final)
 The first South Korean male skater to qualify for the Grand Prix Final with two bronze medals, totalling 22 points of qualification (2018 Skate Canada and 2018 Grand Prix of Helsinki)
 The first South Korean male skater to medal at two consecutive ISU Grand Prix events. (2018 Skate Canada and 2018 Grand Prix of Helsinki).
 The first South Korean male skater to medal at an ISU Grand Prix event (2018 Skate Canada)
 The first South Korean male skater to win an ISU Challenger Series event (2022 CS Finlandia Trophy) 
 The first South Korean male skater to medal at the ISU Junior Grand Prix Final (2016–17 Junior Grand Prix Final)
 The first South Korean male skater to win two consecutive ISU Junior Grand Prix events (2016 Junior Grand Prix Japan, 2016 Junior Grand Prix Germany)
 The first South Korean skater to land a quad jump at a competition recognized by the ISU (2016 Junior Grand Prix Japan)
 At 14 years old, Cha was the youngest man to land a quad Salchow at the 2016 Junior Grand Prix Japan. Record was broken by Stephen Gogolev (Canada) at the 2018 Junior Grand Prix Slovakia.

Historical record 
 Set the junior-level men's record for the combined total with 239.47 points at the 2016 Junior Grand Prix Japan. Record was broken by Dmitri Aliev (Russia) at the 2016–17 Junior Grand Prix Final with 240.07 points.

Programs

Competitive highlights

GP: Grand Prix; CS: Challenger Series; JGP: Junior Grand Prix

2010–11 to 2014–15: Pre-junior international debut

Detailed results

Senior level 

Small medals for short and free programs awarded only at ISU Championships. At team events, medals awarded for team results only. Personal best highlighted in bold.

Junior level 

Small medals for short and free programs awarded only at ISU Championships. At team events, medals awarded for team results only. Previous ISU world bests highlighted in bold.

Filmography

Television series

Television shows

References

External links 

 
 

2001 births
Living people
South Korean male single skaters
Figure skaters from Seoul
Olympic figure skaters of South Korea
Figure skaters at the 2016 Winter Youth Olympics
Figure skaters at the 2018 Winter Olympics
Figure skaters at the 2022 Winter Olympics
Four Continents Figure Skating Championships medalists
South Korean male child actors